Herndon is a town in Fairfax County, Virginia, in the Washington, D.C. metropolitan area of the United States. The population was 23,292 at the 2010 census. In 2020, the population was estimated to be 24,532, which makes it the largest of three incorporated towns in the county.

The actual dimensions of the town of Herndon are fairly small. However, the United States Post Office treats nearby unincorporated communities in northwestern Fairfax County as part of a Greater Herndon region, including Dranesville, Floris, Franklin Farm, McNair, and Oak Hill.

History
The early settlement was named Herndon in 1858, after Commander William Lewis Herndon, an American naval explorer and author of Exploration of the Valley of the Amazon. Commander Herndon captained the ill-fated steamer SS Central America, going down with his ship while helping to save over 150 of its passengers and crew. In the 1870s, many Northern soldiers and their families came to settle in the area, taking advantage of moderate climate and low land prices.

Originally part of the rural surroundings of the Washington, D.C. area, the town of Herndon developed into a hub of dairy farming and vacationing for area residents, aided by its presence along the Alexandria, Loudoun and Hampshire Railroad (later to become the Washington and Old Dominion (W&OD) Railroad). When the railroad was converted into a hike-and-bike trail, Herndon capitalized on history and small-town feel (in a major metropolitan region) by converting its train station into a museum and visitors center and by relocating a Norfolk Southern Railway caboose to a nearby site and repainting it in W&OD livery.

The caboose was originally acquired in 1989 by Herndon Historical Society member, George Moore, to whose memory the caboose was dedicated after his death in 2003.  Although the caboose itself never traveled through Herndon, it remains an iconic part of the downtown area that both locals and tourists visit daily.  The caboose and station offer a glimpse of the original downtown's historic charm, which residents are passionate about preserving.

On January 14, 2004, the Town of Herndon commemorated its 125th anniversary.

The town of Herndon was part of a nationally reported controversy involving illegal immigration beginning in 2005.  The controversy revolved around a day labor center called the Herndon Official Worker Center (HOW Center), operated by Reston Interfaith's Project Hope and Harmony under a grant from surrounding Fairfax County.  The HOW Center was created on March 23, 2006 in response to daily gatherings of Hispanic workers at a local 7-Eleven store. The 2006 election for Mayor and Town Council revolved mainly around the issue, and resulted in unseating the pro-center Mayor and two councilmembers.  The center closed after less than two years of operation, in September 2007.

The Herndon Historic District is listed on the National Register of Historic Places.

Geography
Herndon is located at  (38.971478, −77.388675).

According to the United States Census Bureau, the town has a total area of 4.2 square miles (10.9 km2), all of it land.
Just over two acres of land in the town are technically in Loudoun County.

Demographics

As of the census of 2010, there were 23,292 people, 7,472 households, and 5,357 families residing in the town. The racial makeup of the town was 50.7% White, 9.5% Black, 0.7% Native American, 17.9% Asian (8.5% Indian, 1.6% Vietnamese, 1.5% Chinese, 1.2% Filipino, 0.7% Korean, 0.1% Japanese, 4.2% Other Asian), 0.0% Pacific Islander, 16.0% from other races, and 5.2% from two or more races. Hispanic or Latino of any race were 33.6% of the population.

There were 6,962 households, of which 41.7% had children under the age of 18 living with them, 56.8% were married couples living together, 9.4% had a female householder with no husband present, and 28.6% were non-families. 20.6% of all households were made up of individuals, and 2.8% had someone living alone who was 65 years of age or older. The average household size was 3.11 and the average family size was 3.54.

In the town, the population was spread out, with 27.1% under the age of 18, 10.2% from 18 to 24, 38.3% from 25 to 44, 20.5% from 45 to 64, and 3.9% who were 65 years of age or older. The median age was 32 years. For every 100 females, there were 111.4 males. For every 100 females age 18 and over, there were 111.0 males.

The median income for a household in the town was $72,912, and the median income for a family was $79,140 (these figures had risen to $92,947 and $108,446 respectively as of a 2007 estimate). Males had a median income of $44,197 versus $35,548 for females. The per capita income for the town was $26,941. About 4.7% of families and 8.1% of the population were below the poverty line, including 9.1% of those under age 18 and 5.5% of those age 65 or over.

Economy

Herndon is part of the Dulles Technology Corridor, which Fortune magazine named the "Netplex" because of the presence of the headquarters of such companies as AOL, XO Communications, Stride, Inc., Verizon Business (formerly MCI, formerly WorldCom, originally UUNET), and Network Solutions, which began as the InterNIC – the registry where every domain name was once administered.

Some of those companies are within Herndon. Others have Herndon mailing addresses, but are located in unincorporated Fairfax or Loudoun counties; for example, south of the Dulles Toll Road.  These include Deltek and Stride.

Top employers
According to the Town's 2022 Annual Comprehensive Financial Report, the principal employers in the Town are:

Prior year's CAFRS are also available.

Government

The town is organized as an incorporated town by the Commonwealth of Virginia,
and is governed by an elected Mayor and Town Council
who serve on a part-time basis. Update on Town of Herndon, Virginia

The current Mayor is Sheila A. Olem, who was first elected to Council in 2010 and served as Vice Mayor in 2018 until her election as Mayor in 2020.  The Mayor chairs the Council and heads the executive branch of the town government. The Police Department, independent of the county police department, is headed by Chief Maggie DeBoard, and consists of 56 sworn officers along with the assistance of the Herndon Police Citizen Support Team. The Herndon Police Department achieved national recognition on November 8, 1986 by becoming the seventh police agency in Virginia and the 42nd police agency in the United States to be accredited by the Commission on Accreditation for Law Enforcement Agencies.

Attractions
Herndon boasts a wide variety of diversions and celebrations year round. Among the community events are:

Herndon contains the Herndon Depot Museum, the site of "Mosby's Raid on Herndon Station", which was a Civil War skirmish that took place on St. Patrick's Day, 1863. Also within the town is The Herndon Centennial Golf Course, the Herndon ArtSpace (a community art gallery), community center with basketball and racquetball courts and multiple baseball fields, and an aquatic center. Adjacent to the community center is Bready Park, with indoor tennis courts. Additionally, every residence within the town borders is within a mile or less of a public park. Herndon is home to a professional live theatre, NextStop Theatre, which produces a variety of plays, musicals, concerts, and educational theatre programming each season.

Education

Primary and secondary schools
Herndon is within the Fairfax County Public Schools district.

Public schools serving students within the Herndon town limits are:
 Clearview Elementary School
 Dranesville Elementary School
 Herndon Elementary School
 Hutchison Elementary School
 Herndon Middle School
 Herndon High School

Private school options include: Temple Baptist, St Joseph's Elementary and several Montessori schools.

Private schools south of Herndon, in nearby Floris:
King Abdullah Academy
Nysmith School (PK-8)

Public libraries
Fairfax County Public Library operates the Herndon Fortnightly Library in Herndon.

Transportation

The primary highway serving Herndon is Virginia State Route 228 and its truck route. SR 228 heads directly through the center of town via Elden Street, Monroe Street, Park Avenue and Dranesville Road. SR 228 Truck diverges from Elden Street southwest of downtown on Herndon Parkway, following that road northwestward, northward and northeastward around central Herndon, finally reaching Dranesville Road north of downtown. At the south end of town, SR 228 meets Virginia State Route 267, a high speed, high-capacity toll road which provides access to Washington, D.C. (via Interstate 66) and Washington Dulles International Airport. In 2022, the Silver Line’s extension opened, providing service at Herndon station.

Climate
The climate in this area is characterized by hot, humid summers and generally mild to cool winters.  According to the Köppen Climate Classification system, Herndon has a humid subtropical climate, abbreviated "Cfa" on climate maps.

Notable people

 Jeremy Barlow, professional soccer player
 Neil Barlow, professional soccer player
 Rod Beaton, sports journalist for USA Today
 Jon Carman, former professional American football player
 Jerome Cornfield, statistician
 Albert Scott Crossfield, American naval officer and test pilot
 Jay A. DeLoach, American naval officer
 Ronnie Dove, pop and country musician
 Wesley L. Fox, USMC Colonel Retired, Medal of Honor recipient, and former Deputy Commandant Virginia Tech Corps of Cadets
 Romain Gall, professional soccer player
 Angie Goff, broadcast journalist
 Brandon Guyer, professional American baseball player
 Joe Snively, professional Washington Capitals ice hockey player
 Ferenc Nagy, former Prime Minister of Hungary
 Štefan Osuský, Slovak politician and diplomat
 Sean Parker, founder of Napster and former president of Facebook
 Scottie Reynolds, former Villanova Wildcats basketball player
 Thomas Davis Rust, Virginia Delegate and former Mayor of Herndon
 Brendan Shapiro, gym teacher and Survivor contestant
 Chris Smith, Congressman  NJ District 4
 Tasos Georgiou Vatikiotis, former professional footballer

Sister cities

Its sister city is Runnymede, Surrey, England, United Kingdom.

See also 
Northern Virginia
Reston, Virginia
Washington Dulles International Airport
Washington Metropolitan Area

Notes

References

External links

 
 U.S. Census Bureau: American Fact-Finder: Herndon, 
 ArtSpace Herndon
 Herndon Council for the Arts
 Elden Street Players
 List of Restaurants in Herndon (A wide variety, sorted by ethnicity and location)
 Wolf Trap National Park for the Performing Arts
 Udvar-Hazy Air and Space Museum (Smithsonian Annex) 
 Friends of the W&OD Trail
 Herndon Historical Society
 May 2, 2006 election results
 Final Voyage of the SS Central America Klare, Normand – Historian The Final Voyage of the Central America. Exhaustive research documentation of the tragedy from actual accounts by the survivors of the Central America. A further indepth biography of William Lewis Herndon' s life and US naval career.
 Herndon and Gibbon, Lieutenants, United States Navy Klare, Normand – Historian Herndon and Gibbon. The First North American Explorers of the Amazon Valley. Lieutenant William Lewis Herndon's and Lieutenant Lardner Gibbon's expedition to map the Amazon river from its source to the Atlantic Ocean. Stories from their actual reports to Secretary of the Navy John P. Kennedy, President Millard Fillmore and the House of Representatives of the United States.
 

 
Towns in Virginia
Towns in Fairfax County, Virginia
Washington metropolitan area
Populated places established in 1858
1858 establishments in Virginia